The Asian Renewable Energy Hub (AREH) is a proposal to create one of the world's largest renewable energy plant in the Pilbara region of Western Australia. It was first proposed in 2014, with plans for the project concept changing several times since then. , the project developers BP, Intercontinental Energy, CWP Global, Vestas and Pathway Investments were planning to build a mixture of wind power and solar energy power generators which would generate up to 26 gigawatts of power.

The Government of Western Australia gave environmental approval for phase one of the project (15,000MW of power generation, across  in October 2020. However,  having explored the potential of exporting green hydrogen via the manufacture of ammonia, it was able to aim for an extra 11GW. The plant would use the electricity generated by the wind turbines and solar power to extract hydrogen from water. The hydrogen is then mixed with nitrogen extracted from the air to produce ammonia. 

The ammonia is easily transported using tankers, and opens up the possibility for more markets around the world.

For the ten years of project construction, the project is expected to create 5,000 jobs, with about 3,000 ongoing jobs anticipated over its 50-year lifetime. It is planned to create a coastal town campus between Port Hedland and Broome, and a desalination plants will provide most of the water supply needed for both human consumption and plant cooling purposes.

Given the status of "major project" by the federal government in October 2020, the proposed development of the plant enables the goals set under the Western Australian Renewable Hydrogen Strategy to be brought forward from 2040 to 2030.

After a revised proposal was submitted to the Australian Government, in June 2021 Minister for the Environment Sussan Ley ruled this plan unacceptable owing to its potential impact on threatened migratory species and internationally significant wetlands in the area. Eighty Mile Beach is a RAMSAR listed site which provides habitat for several threatened species of migratory birds and a large population of waterbirds, which would be disrupted by the marine components of the project, which would affect tidal movements. The consortium intended to continue to work on the environmental impact plans and mitigation measures, and is confident in developing and delivering a successful project.

References

Renewable energy in Australia
Pilbara
Energy in Western Australia
Proposed buildings and structures in Australia